Chief genealogical officer, or CGO is an individual who maintains the genealogical integrity of an organization.

Notable CGO 
Dr. Edward MacLysaght,  who was named chief genealogical officer in the 1940s as part of the Irish Heraldic Authority. 
David Rencher, AG, CG, was named CGO of FamilySearch on May 10, 2009. The purpose of his appointment was to ensure genealogical soundness of products and services offered by FamilySearch.
Megan Smolenyak Smolenyak held a similar position at Ancestry.com as the Chief Family Historian.

References 

  
 http://www.genealogyblog.com/?p=4648 
 http://blog.dearmyrtle.com/2009/05/david-e-rencher-named-familysearch-cgo.html 
 https://web.archive.org/web/20100605235617/http://www.mormontimes.com/article/13457/Obituaries-can-help-to-round-out-the-genealogical-story
 http://blogs.ancestry.com/circle/%3Fp%3D966+Meagan+named+chief+family+historian&cd=1&hl=en&ct=clnk&gl=us

Management occupations